is a Japanese manga series written and illustrated by Kazuhiro Fujita. It was serialized in Shogakukan's shōnen manga magazine Weekly Shōnen Sunday from July 1997 to June 2006, with its chapters collected in 43 tankōbon volumes.

The story is centered around a young boy named Masaru Saiga, who inherits a massive fortune and aspires to become a puppeteer; Narumi Katō, a kung-fu expert who suffers from Zonapha syndrome (a strange illness that stops his breathing unless he makes people laugh); and Shirogane, a silver-haired woman and Masaru's caretaker who controls the puppet Harlequin. They must fight against the battling automatons (auto-mannequins) and save the world from the Zonapha syndrome.

Karakuri Circus was adapted into an anime television series by Studio VOLN, which ran for 36 episodes from October 2018 to June 2019. In addition to the anime series, a mobile game was launched in December 2018 and stage play ran in January 2019.

By March 2018, the Karakuri Circus manga series had over 15 million copies in circulation.

Synopsis

Background
The events are tied to a cycle of reincarnation that began 200 years ago when two brothers, Bai Yin and Bai Jin, traveled from China to Prague in order to study alchemy and improve their puppetry skills. The brothers encountered a beautiful woman by the name of Francine and they both fell in love with her. The younger brother, Jin, was devastated when his elder brother Yin proposed to Francine and she agreed to marry him. Fueled by hatred and despair, Jin abducted her. After 9 years of searching, Yin arrived in Quiberon, France, only to discover that Francine had fallen ill and had been imprisoned by fearful villagers. In the hopes of curing and freeing her, Yin then worked to create the Aqua Vitae, an elixir of life that could impart incredible healing powers and a greatly increased lifespan. However when he finally completed it, he found that Francine's prison had been set ablaze and she died moments before he could give it to her.

Another 23 years passed and the younger brother Jin had created an automaton in her image and injected it with Aqua Vitae in hopes of bringing it to life. He was greatly disappointed when he realised that in stark contrast to the original Francine, she would not laugh or smile no matter what he did. He then created automaton clowns to make her laugh, but they failed, so he released the Zonapha (Z.O.N.A.P.H.A.) syndrome into Kuroga village, forcing them to make her laugh or suffer a living death. The Zonapha syndrome is where the body is dominated by the parasympathetic nerves, the trachea contracts, causing breathing difficulties and excruciating pain is felt in every nerve. The symptoms continue unabated until the victim can make someone laugh. Lucille Berneuil was one of the villagers who suffered at the antics of the murderous clowns. Six years later, Yin returned and sacrificed himself to activate the Aqua Vitae with his blood and save the villagers. When Lucille drank the water, she acquired Yin's memories and knowledge along with his puppet Harlequin, and she vowed to crush Jin's automata.

Years later, Shōji Saiga learned swordsmanship at Miura Dojo in Nagasaki while also studying to be a doctor under Dr. Bai Yin. Together they completed a marionette which Shōji named a shirogane. While treating a sick Mr. Nakayama, Shōji encountered a healing woman who called herself Tohno-dayu, although her real name was Angelina. She held the "Soft Stone" within her body which could produce Aqua Vitia. By accident, she revealed that she had Bai Yin's marionette, Arlequin, which she used to help Shōji escape from a burning building. Later, Shōji tracked down Angelina, where she told him about her past and the vial of Aqua Vitae which was given to her. Shōji had fallen in love with her and he drank the liquid, vowing to spend eternity with her.

Shōji and Angelina began to create their own marionettes. They later adopted the shirogane, Dean Maistre as their son, naming him Sadayoshi. Shōji also encountered the Francine automaton who Jin abandoned because she could not laugh. Shōji adjusted her to make her less powerful, although she wanted to be dismantled because she felt that she was missing a vital gear. Some time later, Angelina became pregnant and gave birth to the baby girl, Éléonore.

The family were attacked by automata searching for the Soft Stone, however the Soft Stone was now inside Éléonore and Angelina entrusted the baby to Francine. Francine fell into a well with Éléonore who automatically turned the water into Aqua Vitae which destroyed Francine although she saved Éléonore. Angelina was mortally wounded by the automata and Shōji decided to keep Éléonore's existence a secret so he sent her to the Quiberon orphanage to be raised by Lucille.

37 years later, Shōji visited the orphanage and found that Éléonore remembered him because of the memories of Francine transferred to her via the Aqua Vitae. Shōji then learned that Sadayoshi has had a son called Masaru whom Shōji raised as his grandson. However Sadayoshi's plan was to leave his fortune to Masaru as bait to cause the destruction of the Kuroga clan. Sadayoshi is the reincarnation of Bai Jin, who transferred his memories into a young Bai boy using his hair and Aqua Vitae and then called himself Dean Maistre who was later adopted by Shōji Saiga. He planned to transfer his memories into Masaru and essentially become immortal, but Shōji destroyed the memory data back at Karuizawa and asked Lucille to send Éléonore to protect Masaru and find the soft stone.

Plot

The plot centers around Masaru Saiga, Narumi Katō and the shirogane Éléonore Saiga (known simply as Shirogane), and combines the settings of a circus, alchemy, and karakuri puppets. The story starts when Masaru's father dies and leaves 18 billion yen of inheritance solely to him. His uncle and half-siblings each plot to kill or abduct Masaru to seize the money. By coincidence, the Zonapha sufferer Narumi Katō rescues Masaru from his uncle's henchmen with help from Éléonore. As the story progresses, a 200-year-old tragedy is uncovered involving the origin of the Shirogane, Automatons, and the Zonapha syndrome. The people of the Shirogane group and the Nakamachi Circus group must work together to save the world and prevent its destruction from the Zonapha syndrome.

After the third volume of the manga, the story splits into two separate but related arcs. In the first arc, Narumi Katō joins the Shirogane to battle the automatons (auto-mannequins) and save the world from the Zonapha syndrome. In the second arc,  Éléonore and Masaru join the Nakamachi Circus and attempt to live a normal life as possible but their fates are still heavily linked to their pre-determined destiny. The events triggered by either Narumi or Éléonore's arcs are mentioned on each other's story, sometimes directly affecting one another. Eventually, during the climax of the story, the two paths intersect.

Media

Manga

Karakuri Circus, written and illustrated by Kazuhiro Fujita, was serialized in Shogakukan's Weekly Shōnen Sunday from July 23, 1997, to June 14, 2006. It spanned 425 chapters, which were collected in forty-three tankōbon volumes, released from December 10, 1997, to August 11, 2006. The manga has been reprinted and collected in multiple editions: "My first wide" edition (collected in sixteen volumes, released from November 2008 to February 2010); wide-ban edition (collected in twenty-three volumes, released from July 2011 to April 2013); bunkoban edition (collected in twenty-two volumes, released from May 2017 to February 2019); and kanzenban edition (collected in twenty-six volumes, released from September 2018 to September 2019).

An official guidebook was published by Shogakukan under the Shōnen Sunday Comics Special imprint on July 16, 2004.

Anime

A 36-episode anime television series adaptation aired from October 11, 2018 to June 27, 2019 on Tokyo MX and BS11.<ref></p></ref> The series is animated by Studio VOLN and directed by Satoshi Nishimura, with series composition by Toshiki Inoue and Kazuhiro Fujita and character designs by Takahiro Yoshimatsu. Yuki Hayashi composed the series' music and Twin Engine produced the series. The episodes were collected in three Blu-ray sets released by VAP between June 19 and October 23, 2019.<ref></p></ref> Bump of Chicken performed the series' first opening theme song "Gekkō", and Lozareena performed the first ending theme song "Marionette". The second opening theme song is "Haguruma" performed by Kana-Boon, and the series' second ending theme song "Yūdachi" is performed by Memai Siren.  The third opening theme song is "Over me" performed by Lozareena, while the third ending is the previous first opening song "Gekkō" by Bump of Chicken. The series was simulcast exclusively on Amazon Video worldwide. In February 2021, Sentai Filmworks announced that they had licensed the series for home video and digital release. It was released on Blu-ray Disc  on May 18, 2021.

Smartphone game
A RPG smartphone game developed by Tenda, Kick Ass and Game Gate, titled Karakuri Circus: Larmes d'un Clown, was launched on December 18, 2018.

Stage play
A stage play adaptation ran in Tokyo at the Shinjuku Face theater from January 10–20, 2019. Yū Murai directed the play and Keita Kawajiri wrote the script. The cast included Taiga Fukazawa as Masaru Saiga, Koudai Takikawa as Narumi Kato, Momoka Onishi and Riho Iida as Shirogane/Francine (double cast), Kairi Miura as Bai In, Ryōtarō Kosaka as Bai Jin, Kento as Eiryo Ashihana, Shōjirō Yokoi as George LaRoche, Yūki Ochi as Guy Christophe Rech, Ryōko Tanaka as Lucille Berneuil, Natsuki Maeda as Harlequin, Saki Endō as Fatima, Yōjirō Murata as Faceless, Mitsuru Karahashi as Pantalone, Hiroya Matsumoto as Arlecchino, Seshiru Daigo as Columbine and Shūhei Izumi as Dottore.

Reception
By March 2018, the manga had over 15 million copies in circulation. Karakuri Circus was nominated for the 23rd Kodansha Manga Award in the shōnen category in 1999. It was one of the Jury Recommended Works at the 5th Japan Media Arts Festival in 2001. It was nominated for the 38th Seiun Award in the Best Comic category in 2007. On a 2020 poll conducted by the Goo website about the best Weekly Shōnen Sunday titles, Karakuri Circus ranked ninth. On TV Asahi's Manga Sōsenkyo 2021 poll, in which 150.000 people voted for their top 100 manga series, Karakuri Circus ranked 86th.

References

External links
  
  
 

1997 manga
2006 comics endings
Action anime and manga
Animated television series about robots
Anime series based on manga
Dark fantasy anime and manga
Fiction about alchemy
Films with screenplays by Toshiki Inoue
Robot comics
Sentai Filmworks
Shogakukan franchises
Shogakukan manga
Shōnen manga
Tokyo MX original programming